Strike Out (1969–1998) was a Standardbred North American Harness racing champion.

Background
Strike Out was foaled in 1969 at Castleton Farm in Lexington, Kentucky, and is by Bret Hanover out of the mare Golden Miss.

He was purchased at a yearling auction for $15,000 by Beejay Stables of Oshawa, Ontario, a partnership between harness-racing trainer/driver John Hayes and Montreal, Quebec textile executives, the Shapiro brothers, Robert, Conrad, and Leo. For Hayes, who recognized the horse's talent, it was an opportunity for which he had been waiting a long time.

Racing career
As a two-year-old pacer, Strike Out earned more money than any horse in his age group and was named  by Harness Tracks of America (HTA) and the United States Trotting Association (USTA) as the top harness horse his age in North America. In 1972 he became the first horse to win a Canadian harness race with a $100,000 purse. That year he went on to race in the United States, capturing the important Adios Stakes in a dead heat with Jay Time, the Fox Stake, the Roosevelt Futurity, the Beaver Pace and other major races all over North America, including the Prix d'Été at Montreal's Blue Bonnets Raceway. By the end of the summer, his owners had set their sights on the most prestigious race of all, the Little Brown Jug in Delaware, Ohio. Strike Out, was trained by Bruce K. Nickells for two months the previous winter, before he won the Jug with a time of 1:56.3 which set a world record for a three-year-old pacer on a half mile track.

On September 21, 1972, driven by Keith Waples, Strike Out became the first Canadian owned horse to win the Little Brown Jug. Not only did he do it in straight heats, but he won setting a world record over a half-mile track for a 3-year-old pacer in a time of 1:56 3/5. Strike Out was named by the HTA and USTA as top three-year-old.

Stud career
After compiling a 29-9-1 record in 44 races, Strike Out was retired to stud at the end of the 1972 season. While retaining a half interest in him, Beejay Stables sold the $15,000 bargain-basement colt for $1.5 million. His son, Striking Image became the first 2 year old Standardbred Horse ever to run a mile in the time of 1:55. Strike Out also went on to sire 1979 Jug winner Hot Hitter.

In 1976 Strike Out was part of the inaugural class inducted into the Canadian Horse Racing Hall of Fame.

Strike Out died on July 4, 1998 and was buried in the horse cemetery at Castleton Farms.

Pedigree

References

1969 racehorse births
1998 racehorse deaths
American Standardbred racehorses
Canadian Horse Racing Hall of Fame inductees
Racehorses trained in Canada
Horse racing track record setters
Little Brown Jug winners